Melhania angustifolia is a plant in the family Malvaceae. It is endemic to Zanzibar.

Description
The flowers have bright yellow petals.

Distribution and habitat
Melhania angustifolia is native to the Zanzibar Archipelago where only seven specimens are known and the species is threatened by tourism-linked development. Its habitat is in bushland or on sand, near sea level.

References

angustifolia
Endemic flora of Tanzania
Plants described in 1900
Taxa named by Karl Moritz Schumann